Heldburger Unterland is a Verwaltungsgemeinschaft ("collective municipality" or "community of administration" ) in the district of Hildburghausen, in Thuringia, Germany. The seat of the Verwaltungsgemeinschaft is in Heldburg.

The Verwaltungsgemeinschaft Heldburger Unterland consists of the following municipalities:
Heldburg
Schlechtsart 
Schweickershausen 
Straufhain 
Ummerstadt
Westhausen

The municipality Straufhain became member of Verwaltungsgemeinschaft Heldburger Unterland on 31 December 2013.

References

Verwaltungsgemeinschaften in Thuringia